The 1953 Humboldt State Lumberjacks football team represented Humboldt State College during the 1953 college football season. Humboldt State competed in the Far Western Conference (FWC).

The 1953 Lumberjacks were led by third-year head coach Phil Sarboe. They played home games at the Redwood Bowl in Arcata, California. Humboldt State finished with a record of six wins and two losses (6–2, 2–1 FWC). The Lumberjacks outscored their opponents 122–39 for the season. The defense yielded more than a touchdown in only two games and had four shutouts.

Schedule

Notes

References

Humboldt State
Humboldt State Lumberjacks football seasons
Humboldt State Lumberjacks football